Hugo Emil Hergesell (29 May 1859 in Bromberg – 6 June 1938 in Berlin) was a German meteorologist.

Works
 He co-founded "Beiträge zur Physik der freien Atmosphäre" (1904-; with Richard Assmann)
 Ergebnisse aerologischer Beobachtungen an internationalen Tagen, 1900–1913, 1925–1928

Awards
1913 Buys Ballot Medal of the Royal Netherlands Academy of Arts and Sciences
1928 Symons Gold Medal of the Royal Meteorological Society.

References

External links
 

1859 births
1938 deaths
People from Bydgoszcz
German meteorologists
People from the Province of Posen
Recipients of the Buys Ballot Medal (Netherlands)